Brian Frederick McNicholl, OAM (born 30 December 1951) is a New Zealand-born Australian Paralympic powerlifter, weightlifter, wheelchair basketballer, and athlete, who won five medals at six Paralympic games from 1976 to 1996.

Personal
McNicholl was born on 30 December 1951 in Christchurch, New Zealand, and became a paraplegic after contracting polio at the age of eleven months. During school, he was forced to sit in the library while sport lessons were taking place; this fuelled his love for sport. He moved from New Zealand to Australia in 1978.

Career
McNicholl's first and only medal for New Zealand was silver at the 1976 Toronto Games in the Men's Slalom 4 event.  At the same games McNicholl competed in the 100 m race, and placed fourth in both shot put and the lightweight weightlifting event.

After moving to Australia in 1978, he represented the country at five Paralympics and won three bronze, another silver and a gold medal, all in weightlifting and powerlifting.  At the 1980 Arnhem Games, he placed fourth again in the shot put event, was part of the Australia men's national wheelchair basketball team that came thirteenth at the Games, and won a bronze medal in the Men's Middleweight −75 kg paraplegic weightlifting event. At the 1984 New York/Stoke Mandeville Games, McNicholl finished 4th in the same weight bracket. In 1985, he won his first World Wheelchair Championships. McNicholl won another bronze medal at the 1988 Seoul Games in the Men's Up To 85 kg weightlifting event.

He later said of the win: "Although placed in other Paralympics (before '92), I was inexperienced and didn't quite know how to handle the pressure." In 1994, he set another world record when he lifted , and won his third World Wheelchair Weightlifting Championships in Melbourne, Australia. He was coached by Blagoy Blagoev, and advised by Olympic runner Herb Elliott, who he has known since the 1980s. In 1995, he was an Australian Institute of Sport Athlete with a Disability scholarship holder.

His second silver medal, and first for Australia, was at the 1996 Atlanta Games in the Men's Up To 90 kg powerlifting event.

Despite being ranked second in the world in 1999, McNicholl retired from competitive lifting a few months before the 2000 Sydney Paralympics due to injury. That year, he received an Australian Sports Medal.

Other sports work
McNicholl served as the Chairman of Australian Weightlifting for People With Disabilities. From 1995 to 1998, he was the strength and conditioning coach for Collingwood Football Club. He also spent six years promoting sport in schools for the Victorian Department of Sport and Recreation.

References

External links 
 
 

1951 births
Living people
Paralympic athletes of Australia
Paralympic athletes of New Zealand
Paralympic wheelchair basketball players of Australia
Paralympic weightlifters of Australia
Paralympic weightlifters of New Zealand
Paralympic powerlifters of Australia
Paralympic gold medalists for Australia
Paralympic silver medalists for Australia
Paralympic silver medalists for New Zealand
Paralympic bronze medalists for Australia
Athletes (track and field) at the 1976 Summer Paralympics
Athletes (track and field) at the 1980 Summer Paralympics
Wheelchair basketball players at the 1980 Summer Paralympics
Weightlifters at the 1976 Summer Paralympics
Weightlifters at the 1980 Summer Paralympics
Weightlifters at the 1984 Summer Paralympics
Weightlifters at the 1988 Summer Paralympics
Weightlifters at the 1992 Summer Paralympics
Powerlifters at the 1996 Summer Paralympics
Medalists at the 1976 Summer Paralympics
Medalists at the 1980 Summer Paralympics
Medalists at the 1988 Summer Paralympics
Medalists at the 1992 Summer Paralympics
Medalists at the 1996 Summer Paralympics
Paralympic medalists in athletics (track and field)
Paralympic medalists in weightlifting
Paralympic medalists in powerlifting
Wheelchair category Paralympic competitors
Australian male wheelchair racers
People with paraplegia
Sportspeople from Christchurch
New Zealand expatriate sportspeople in Australia
Recipients of the Medal of the Order of Australia
Recipients of the Australian Sports Medal
Australian Institute of Sport Athletes with a Disability alumni